The Nissan 240SX is a sports compact car that was introduced to the North American market by Nissan in 1989 for the 1990 model year. It replaced the outgoing 200SX (S12) model. Most of the 240SXs were equipped with the 2.4-liter inline 4 engine (KA24E from 1989 to 1990 and KA24DE from 1990 to 1998). The KA24E had single overhead cams and the KA24DE had dual overhead cams. Two distinct generations of the 240SX, the S13 (1989–1994) the S14 (1994-1998) were produced, based on the Nissan S platform.

The 240SX is closely related to other S platform based vehicles, such as the Japanese-market Silvia and 180SX, and the European-market 200SX. Although their names are similar, the 240SX is unrelated to the 240Z or the 280ZX.

While the car is no longer being produced since 1998, it remains popular in drifting and tuner culture. However, due to the popularity of the S-chassis in drifting or other related competitions, prices for vehicles and parts have greatly increased because of higher demand of the vehicles or parts. This problem is sometimes known as "drift tax".

Because of its extreme popularity in drifting or similar competitions, the 240SX is featured in numerous racing video games such as Midnight Club and Forza Motorsport, among others. 



First generation (S13; 1989–1994)

The first generation of the 240SX can be divided into two distinct versions, both having the sporting advantage of rear wheel drive. The hatchback, which was offered in base, SE, and LE trims, and the coupé, which was offered in base, XE, LE and SE trims. Both styles shared the same front bodywork as the Japanese-market Nissan 180SX, featuring the sloping front with pop-up headlights. This front bodywork distinguishes the coupé model from its Japanese-market counterpart, the Silvia, which featured fixed headlights. Both styles in all markets share the same chassis, and with few exceptions, most components and features are identical. The 240SX is a popular car in the sport of drifting due to its long wheelbase, low cost, ample power, light weight, well-balanced chassis and abundant aftermarket support.

1989 and 1990 models are powered by a naturally aspirated ,   SOHC KA24E 4-cylinder engine with 3 valves per cylinder (instead of the turbocharged and intercooled 1.8-liter DOHC CA18DET offered in Japan and Europe in the 180SX and Silvia). Four-wheel disc brakes were standard, with anti-lock brakes available as an option on the SE. Both models were offered with either a 5-speed manual or 4-speed automatic transmission. Coupes offered a Heads-up display (HUD) with a digital speedometer as part of the optional Power Convenience Group.

The 240SX received some updates in 1991. The matte silver, teardrop wheels were replaced by polished aluminium 7-spoke wheels that had better brake cooling properties but more drag. The nose was smoothed out by getting rid of the non-functional slots and gave back the aerodynamic efficiencies lost by the wheels. This gave the car an overhaul that included a minor update of the exterior and a new cylinder head. A new "LE" hatchback trim package was added that included leather interior. An optional sports package including ABS, a limited-slip differential, and Nissan's HICAS four-wheel steering was now available on hatchback models.

The S13 was known for sharp steering and handling (thanks to front MacPherson struts and a rear multilink suspension) and relatively light weight (2700 lb) but was regarded in the automotive press as being underpowered. The engine, while durable and relatively torquey, was a heavy iron-block truck unit that produced meager power for its relatively large size. It was only modestly improved by the change to the DOHC version in 1991. Furthermore, despite the modest power output, relatively low vehicle weight, and good aerodynamics, gas mileage was mediocre. These engines are the primary difference between the North American 240SX and the international-market Silvia/180SX/200SX. The KA24DE did not come turbocharged while the CA18DET and SR20DET did. The U.S. version was regarded as a highly capable sports car that only needed a better engine. Other differences include a standard limited-slip differential on overseas and Canadian models, available digital climate control in Japan, and manual seat belts standard in Japan and Canada vs. automatic restraint seatbelts in the U.S.

Convertible 

In 1992, a convertible was added to the lineup and was exclusive to the North American market. These vehicles began life in Japan as coupés and were later modified in the California facilities of American Specialty Cars (ASC). For the 1994 model year, the only 240SX available was a Special Edition (SE) convertible, equipped with a 4-speed automatic transmission.

The North American 240SX convertible differed from the Japanese market version, in that the Japanese market models had a powered top cover boot, whereas the North American market models had manually-installed boot covers once the top is down. It was also produced in Japan by a different manufacturer rather than by ASC, and was introduced early on in the S13's production in Japan (the Japanese market models were released in 1988, four years before the 240SX convertible).

Second generation (S14; 1994–1998)

The 240SX was released in the spring of 1994 as a 1995 model. The hatchback and convertible body styles were eliminated, leaving only the coupe. The wheelbase of the
car grew  and the track width was also increased, while the overall length of the vehicle was slightly shorter than the previous generation. The curb weight of the vehicle increased by about  relative to the 1994 model. Dual air bags were added and the automatic seatbelts were replaced with common manual type. The pop-up headlights were relaxed with fixed headlamps. The cupholders were also removed in this generation of the Nissan 240SX. Though the general layout remained the same, almost all parts were redesigned to the extent that very few parts are interchangeable. The chassis was changed slightly to increase stiffness (Nissan claimed 50% torsional, 100% bending rigidity increase) and utilized higher rear strut mounts. The fuel tank, previously located at the rear end under the trunk floor, now sits in front of the rear suspension and behind the rear seats.

The base model had 4-lug, 15-inch wheels, a softer suspension, and no rear sway bar. The base model had several options and features available to be fitted to the car such as leather seats, ABS, and a viscous limited-slip differential. SE and LE models came equipped with 5-lug, 16-inch alloy wheels, a stiffer suspension than the base model, and a rear sway bar. The LE was basically an upgraded SE model, but with more standard equipment such as leather seats, keyless entry, an anti-theft system, and a CD player. Anti-lock brakes and a viscous limited-slip differential could be had as an optional package to both base and SE/LE models.

In 1996, the 1997 model year 240SX received minor updates. The different looks of the S-Chassis are referred to as before change "Zenki" and after change "Kouki". Changes were mostly aesthetic, including new projector headlights, front bumper, hood, fenders, and revised taillights and center panel. Side skirts became standard on the SE and LE trim level. 1998 marked the end of production for the Nissan 240SX, with no further variations released in North America.

This generation of the 240SX suffered in sales due to competition from other car manufacturers and consumers at the time choosing more practical vehicles, such as SUVs. In this generation, every 240SX was built in Kyūshū, Japan. The last 240SX rolled off the assembly line on July 23, 1998.

Motorsport

The IMSA GTU Nissan 240SX was originally piloted [see image] by vintage Datsun and Nissan racer Bob Leitzinger through the late 1980s and 1990s. It is currently owned and raced by Philip Mendelovitz. The tube chassis was custom built for IMSA GTU class racing. From Speedhunters: "The roofline and taillight lenses are some of the only parts this thing shares with a normal S13. 

The engine is Nissan's VG30 V6 typically found in the Nissan Z and D21 truck. It is naturally aspirated and dry sumped, and a United States engine builder who managed to help the single overhead cam V6 to make about 340 horsepower.

Chassis code LR-001, seen right, was entered in nearly 80 different events during its career, and it helped Nissan earn four-straight manufacturers championship wins between 1991 and 1994. (Speedhunters)

The engine tuning system utilizes a Sony Walkman to write engine performance metrics to tape. These tapes are fed to a special computer to change fueling, timing, and other tuning parameters.

Drifting

The Nissan 240SX has been a popular choice in the drifting community. Although it was never marketed to the drifting community during its release, it was adopted in Japan during the golden age of drifting. It was chosen for its balanced weight distribution of 55/45 front to rear, and its overall lightweight RWD layout.

References

Works cited

240SX
Rear-wheel-drive vehicles
Hatchbacks
Sport compact cars
Coupés
Convertibles
1990s cars
Cars introduced in 1989
Cars discontinued in 1998